Sacha Massot (born 24 October 1983) is a Belgian retired basketball player and current coach. Massot played with the Belgium national basketball team at EuroBasket 2013. He has been the head coach of Liège Basket and Limburg United.

Coaching career
Massot started his coaching career with Liège Basket in the Belgian PBL. In both the 2018–19 and 2019–20 season, he finished in last place with the club which was dealing with financial struggles.

In March 2020, Massot signed as head coach of Limburg United starting from the 2020–21 season. On 30 September 2021, he was fired by Limburg after a 0–3 start in the Belgian League.

Awards and accomplishments

Playing career
Spirou
6× Belgian Basketball League Champion: (2003, 2004, 2009, 2010, 2011, 2013)

References

1983 births
Belgian men's basketball players
Belgian basketball coaches
Spirou Charleroi players
Power forwards (basketball)
Living people
Liège Basket coaches
Limburg United coaches
People from Tongeren
Sportspeople from Limburg (Belgium)